Tétange railway station is a railway station serving Tétange, in the commune of Kayl, in south-western Luxembourg.  It is operated by Chemins de Fer Luxembourgeois, the state-owned railway company.

The station is situated on Line 60, which connects Luxembourg City to the Red Lands of the south of the country.  Tétange is the second stop on a branch line that, splitting from the main line at Noertzange, leads to Rumelange.

External links
 Official CFL page on Tétange station 
 Rail.lu page on Tétange station

Kayl
Railway stations in Luxembourg
Railway stations on CFL Line 60